James Clarke Cribb (1856 - 1926) was a businessman and politician in Queensland, Australia . He was a Member of the Queensland Legislative Assembly.

Early life
James Clarke Cribb was born 4 October 1856 at Ipswich, the son of Benjamin Cribb (a Member of the Queensland Legislative Assembly) and his second wife, Clarissa Foote (the sister of John Clarke Foote). His middle name Clarke was the maiden name of his maternal grandmother, Elizabeth Clarke.

Business interests 
He followed into the family business of Cribb & Foote, a major retailer in Ipswich. Cribb was also a member of the board of the Ipswich Hospital, a director of the Ipswich Gas and Coke Company and the Queensland Woollen Mills, and a trustee of the Ipswich Grammar School.

Like his parents, James was an active member of the Ipswich Congregational Church. One of the ambitious projects of the church was the establishment of a Sunday School to educate both adults and children. This required the construction of the large two-storey Congregational Sunday School (now known as the Uniting Church Central Memorial Hall and listed on the Queensland Heritage Register). James Clarke Cribb was appointed superintendent of the Sunday School and by 1895 had 429 scholars and fifty-one teachers under his supervision.

Politics
James Cribb served the family company until 1904, when he was elected to the Bundamba Shire Council, serving a total of 19 years as a state parliamentarian. Cribb was also a member of the board of the Ipswich Hospital, a director of the Ipswich Gas and Coke Company and the Queensland Woollen Mills, a trustee of the Ipswich and superintendent of the Congregational Sunday School.

On 6 May 1893, James Clarke Cribb was elected to the Queensland Legislative Assembly in the electoral district of Rosewood; he held that seat until 21 March 1896.

On 18 March 1899, he was elected in the electoral district of Bundamba. He held that seat until 27 April 1912, when it became the electoral district of Bremer. On 27 April 1912, he was elected in the electoral district of Bremer; he held that seat until 22 May 1915. He served for a total of 19 years in the Queensland parliament.

Later life
James Clarke Cribb died on 23 May 1926	at Ipswich and was buried in the Ipswich General Cemetery.

References

Members of the Queensland Legislative Assembly
1856 births
1926 deaths
Burials at Ipswich General Cemetery
Pre-Separation Queensland